The 1971 Australian Grand Prix was a motor race held at Warwick Farm Raceway in New South Wales, Australia on 21 November 1971. It was open to Racing Cars complying with either Australian Formula 1 or Australian Formula 2 regulations.

The race was the thirty sixth running of the Australian Grand Prix. Frank Matich won his second straight AGP and, as in 1970, he started the race on pole and also set the fastest race lap. The race marked the debut of Matich's self designed and built Matich A50 which was powered by a Repco Holden V8 engine. Matich won the race by 58.7 seconds from Kevin Bartlett driving a McLaren M10B-Chevrolet, with Alan Hamilton, also driving McLaren M10B-Chevrolet, 1.1 seconds behind Bartlett in third place.

Other than two New Zealanders, the only international driver in the event was  Formula One World Drivers' Champion John Surtees. The Englishman started ninth in his Surtees TS8-Chevrolet, and battled with Bartlett, Hamilton, and, until his retirement, Colin Bond in the McLaren M10B in which Matich had won the 1970 Australian Grand Prix. Surtees ultimately placed 14th after suffering two punctures late in the race. 1971 Rothmans F5000 European Championship winner Frank Gardner was unable to start the race after damaging his Lola T300 in the first practice session on the Saturday.

Classification 

Results as follows:

Official practice

Grid positions for the race were determined during "official practice".

Race

 (AF2) indicates Australian Formula 2 car

Notes 
Pole position: Frank Matich – 1'24.3
Fastest lap: Frank Matich – 1'24.6 (94.75 mph / 154.08 km/h)
 Starters: 23
 Finishers: 15
 Australian Formula 2 Class winner: Gary Campbell

References

External links
 Formula 5000 1971, autopics.com.au

Grand Prix
Australian Grand Prix
Formula 5000 race reports
Motorsport at Warwick Farm
Australian Grand Prix